is a Japanese writer. She has won the Akutagawa Prize and the Fumiko Hayashi Literary Prize, and her work has been nominated for the Nihon SF Taisho Award.

Biography 

Haneko Takayama was born in 1975 in Toyama, Japan, and graduated from Tama Art University. She made her literary debut with her science fiction story , which received the first honorable mention at the inaugural Sogen SF Short Story Prize awards in 2010 and was then published in an anthology of the prize nominees. Udon, Kitsune-tsuki no was later reprinted as the title story of a 2014 collection of Takayama's short stories, which was a finalist for the 36th Nihon SF Taisho Award.

In addition to ¥1 million in cash, the prize included publication of the story in the mid-April issue of Fujin Kōron.

In 2018 her short story collection , with a title story about a man visiting his hometown and dealing with his memories, was published by Asahi Shimbun. The collection also included the previously published story The Island on the Side of the Sun. Reviewer Tetsuo Machiguchi, writing in book review journal Dokushojin, praised Takayama as an "extraordinary writer" who "crosses genre boundaries".  Objectum was subsequently named as a finalist for the 39th Nihon SF Taisho Award.

Later that year her story  was published in Bungei, with critic Atsushi Sasaki of the Nishinippon Shimbun calling it an "unmistakable masterpiece". Ita basho was subsequently nominated for the 160th Akutagawa Prize. It survived the first round of selection committee voting, with committee members praising the atmosphere created in the book, but the committee ultimately concluded that some of the fantasy elements were unsatisfying, and awarded the prize to two other authors. Six months later, Takayama's story , published in the May issue of Subaru, was nominated for the 161st Akutagawa Prize.

Takayama won the 163rd Akutagawa Prize for her work , a novel inspired by her travels to Okinawa. Shuri no uma follows a museum archivist in Okinawa and her response to seeing a type of horse native to the island. The novel was also nominated for the Yukio Mishima Prize.

Recognition 
 2016: 2nd Fumiko Hayashi Literary Prize
 2020: 163rd Akutagawa Prize

Selected works 
 , Tōkyō Sōgensha, 2014, 
 , Asahi Shimbun, 2018, 
 , Shinchosha, 2020,

References

Living people
1975 births
21st-century Japanese novelists
21st-century Japanese women writers
Japanese women novelists
Japanese science fiction writers
Akutagawa Prize winners